The City municipality of Vranje is one of two city municipalities which constitute the City of Vranje. According to the 2011 census results, the municipality has a population of 73,944 inhabitants, while the urban area has 55,138 inhabitants.

See also 
 Municipalities of Serbia

References

External links 

Populated places in Pčinja District
Municipalities of Vranje